Anthony J. Cimini (February 12, 1922 – August 25, 1987) was a Republican member of the Pennsylvania House of Representatives.

References

Republican Party members of the Pennsylvania House of Representatives
1922 births
1987 deaths
20th-century American politicians